() or Morlacco del Grappa is an Italian cow's-milk cheese from Monte Grappa, in the provinces of Vicenza, Treviso, and Belluno) where cheesemakers once produced a soft cow's milk cheese, low in fat, with an uncooked curd that was named after their native region: Morlachia. 

The local Burlina cows - a breed that is at risk of extinction - produced the milk used for this cheese. The Burlina cow is small and hardy and has a piebald black and white coat. 

Today, Morlacco del Grappa cheese is once again produced on Monte Grappa with skimmed milk from the evening's milking mixed with whole milk from that of the morning. After 20 days of aging, the cheese is ready for consumption, but it can be left to age for up to three months.

References 

cheese
Cheeses of Veneto
Italian cheeses
Cow's-milk cheeses